Live in Hyde Park may refer to:

 Hyde Park Live, a Rolling Stones album 
 Live in Hyde Park (Red Hot Chili Peppers album) 
 All the People: Blur Live at Hyde Park 
 London Calling: Live in Hyde Park, a Bruce Springsteen album 
 Jeff Lynne's ELO: Live in Hyde Park 
 Radio 2 Live in Hyde Park 
 Queen Hyde Park 1976 
 Live in Hyde Park (Eric Clapton album) 
 King Crimson Live in Hyde Park